Ngathaingchaung or Ngathainggyaung and sometimes Nga-thaing Chaung and Ngatheingkhyonng is a town and sub-township (fourth-level administrative division of Myanmar) in Yegyi Township, Pathein District of Ayeyarwady Region in Myanmar. The GMT time is +6.5 hours.

Location

Climate

References

 https://www.google.ca/maps/place/Ngathaingchaung/@17.3950051,95.0719553,2013m/data=!3m1!1e3!4m2!3m1!1s0x30c082bdbaa40691:0xdae4edab201c03b8
 http://www.fallingrain.com/world/BM/03/Ngathainggyaung.html
 http://www.tiptopglobe.com/city?i=1459642&n=Ngathainggyaung

Populated places in Ayeyarwady Region